Sumit Ruikar (born 6 June 1990) is an Indian cricketer. He made his first-class debut for Vidarbha in the 2012–13 Ranji Trophy on 1 December 2012.

He was the leading wicket-taker for Chhattisgarh in the 2017–18 Ranji Trophy, with 23 dismissals in six matches.

References

External links
 

1990 births
Living people
Indian cricketers
Chhattisgarh cricketers
Vidarbha cricketers
Cricketers from Nagpur